The Provincial Assembly of Karnali Province also known as the Karnali Pradesh Sabha, (Nepali: कर्णाली प्रदेश सभा) is a unicameral governing and law making body of Karnali Province, one of the seven provinces in Nepal The assembly is seated in the provincial capital at Birendranagar in Surkhet District at the Irrigation Division Office. The assembly has 40 members of whom 24 are elected through first-past-the-post voting and 16 are elected through proportional representation. The term of the assembly is 5 years unless dissolved earlier.

The  First Provincial Assembly was constituted in 2017, after the 2017 provincial elections. The next election took place when the five year term ends in November 2022.

History 
The Provincial Assembly of Karnali Province is formed under Article 175 of the Constitution of Nepal 2015 which guarantees a provincial legislative for each province in the country. The first provincial elections were conducted for all seven provinces in Nepal and the elections in Karnali Province was conducted for 40 seats to the assembly. The election resulted in a victory for the CPN (Unified Marxist–Leninist) and CPN (Maoist Centre) alliance which later went on to form a coalition government under Mahendra Bahadur Shahi from Maoist Centre. The first meeting of the provincial assembly was held on 4 February 2018. Raj Bahadur Shahi from CPN (UML) was elected as the first speaker of the provincial assembly, and Pushpa Ghari Bista from Maoist Centre as the first deputy speaker of the provincial assembly.

List of assemblies

Committees 
Article 195 of the Constitution of Nepal provides provincial assemblies the power to form special committees in order to manage working procedures.

Current composition

See also 
 Karnali Province
 Provincial assemblies of Nepal

References 

Government of Karnali Province
Province legislatures of Nepal
Unicameral legislatures